The 2023 South American U-17 Championship will be the 19th edition of the South American U-17 Championship, the biennial international youth football championship organised by CONMEBOL for the men's under-17 national teams of South America. It will be held in Ecuador between 30 March and 23 April 2023.

The South American U-17 Championship returns after 4 years due to the COVID-19 pandemic forced CONMEBOL to cancel the tournament in 2021.

Same as previous editions, the tournament will act as the CONMEBOL qualifiers for the FIFA U-17 World Cup. The top four teams of the tournament will qualify for the 2023 FIFA U-17 World Cup in Peru as the CONMEBOL representatives, besides Peru who qualified automatically as hosts (if Peru were among the top four teams, the fifth-placed team would also qualify for the 2023 FIFA U-17 World Cup).

Argentina are the defending champions.

Teams
All ten CONMEBOL member national teams are eligible to enter the tournament.

Venues
Ecuador had been originally chosen to host the South American U-17 Championship that was to be held in 2021. That tournament ended up being canceled due to the COVID-19 pandemic, however, Ecuador maintained its right to hold the South American U-17 Championship but in 2023. This will be the fourth time that Ecuador hosts the tournament having previously done so in 1988 (under-16 edition), 2007 and 2011.

Guayaquil and Quito were selected as host cities. Guayaquil will host the first stage's matches in two venues, the Estadio Christian Benítez Betancourt and the Estadio George Capwell. The final stage's matches will be played in Quito also in two venues, the Estadio Olímpico Atahualpa and the Estadio Rodrigo Paz Delgado.

Match officials
On 23 February 2023, CONMEBOL announced a total of 11 referees and 22 assistant referees appointed for the tournament, included a UEFA refereeing team. For the first time, a UEFA refereeing team will participate in the South American U-17 Championship as part of the UEFA–CONMEBOL memorandum of understanding signed in February 2020, which included a referee exchange programme.

Chilean referee Nicolás Gamboa was replaced by his fellow countryman Felipe González.

 Andrés Merlos
Assistants: Pablo González and Sebastián Raineiri
 Dilio Rodríguez
Assistants: Roger Orellana and Rubén Flores
 Savio Pereira
Assistants: Guillerme Dias Camilo and Nailton Sousa
 Felipe González
Assistants: Juan Serrano and Carlos Poblete
 Carlos Betancur
Assistants: Miguel Roldán and Richard Ortiz

 Augusto Aragón
Assistants: Juan Aguiar and Andrés Tola
 Michael Espinoza
Assistants: Roberto Pérez and Coty Carrera
 José Burgos
Assistants: Pablo Llarena and Santiago Fernández
 Ángel Arteaga
Assistants: Carlos López and Antoni García
UEFA TBC
Assistants: TBC and TBC

Support Referees

 David Fuentes (assistant referee)
 Roberto Pérez (main referee)

 Agustín Berisso (assistant referee)

Squads

Players born between 1 January 2006 and 31 December 2010 were eligible to compete in the tournament. Each team could register a maximum of 23 and a minimum of 19 players, including at least 3 goalkeepers (Regulations Articles 46 and 49).

Draw
The draw of the tournament was held on 24 February 2023, 12:00 PYT (UTC−3), at the CONMEBOL headquarters in Luque, Paraguay. The ten teams will be drawn into two groups of five. The hosts Ecuador and defending champions Argentina were seeded into Group A and Group B respectively and assigned to position 1 in their group, while the remaining teams were placed into four "pairing pots" according to their results in the 2019 South American U-17 Championship (shown in brackets).

From each pot, the first team drawn was placed into Group A and the second team drawn was placed into Group B. In both groups, teams from pot 1 were allocated in position 2, teams from pot 2 in position 3, teams from pot 3 in position 4 and teams from pot 4 in position 5.

The draw resulted in the following groups:

First stage
The top three teams in each group will advance to the final stage.

All match times are in ECT (UTC−5), as listed by CONMEBOL.

Group A

Group B

Final stage

Note: Final round schedule may be modified by the Organizing Committee.

Qualified teams for FIFA U-17 World Cup
The following five teams from CONMEBOL qualify for the 2023 FIFA U-17 World Cup, including Peru which qualified as hosts.

1 Bold indicates champions for that year. Italic indicates hosts for that year.

References

2023
2023 South American U-17 Championship
2023 in South American football
2023 in youth association football
2023 in Ecuadorian football

2023 FIFA U-17 World Cup qualification
South American U-17 Championship
South American U-17 Championship